Klenike is a village in the municipality of Bujanovac, Serbia. According to the 2002 census, the village has a population of 268 people.

The Serbian Orthodox monastery of Prohor Pčinjski, built in the 11th century, is located in the village.

References

Populated places in Pčinja District